{{DISPLAYTITLE:C16H25NO2}}
The molecular formula C16H25NO2 may refer to:

 Dendrobine
 Desvenlafaxine
 Emixustat
 Hydroxy alpha sanshool
 Pentethylcyclanone
 Tramadol

Molecular formulas